Dolná Krupá is a village and municipality of Trnava District in the Trnava region of Slovakia. It is located in the Danubian Hills at around 12 km from the city of Trnava.

The important sights in the village are:

 the Saint Andrew church, built in 1807-1811
 the Dolná Krupá mansion.

The Dolná Krupá mansion was one of the residences of the Chotek family. It was the place of the Dolná Krupá rosarium created by countess Marie Henrieta Chotek.

Famous people
John Dopyera, inventor of Dobro

Genealogical resources

The records for genealogical research are available at the state archive "Statny Archiv in Bratislava, Slovakia"

 Roman Catholic church records (births/marriages/deaths): 1689-1895 (parish A)
 Lutheran church records (births/marriages/deaths): 1666-1895 (parish B)

See also
 List of municipalities and towns in Slovakia

References

External links
 
 
Surnames of living people in Dolna Krupa

Villages and municipalities in Trnava District